The Sir Thomas and Lady Dixon Park is a park in South Belfast, Northern Ireland, covering  almost  and is accessible from the Upper Malone Road. It includes meadows, woodland, riverside fields, formal rose gardens, a walled garden and a Japanese garden, as well as a children's playground, coffee shop, an orienteering course and many walks. It is owned and maintained by Belfast City Council's Parks and Cemeteries Services Section. On 14 July 2010, the park hosted annual International Rose Trials, the highlight of Rose Week, involving judges from around the world.

History
The park was bequeathed to the people of Belfast in 1959 by Lady Edith Stewart Dixon and was dedicated to the memory of her husband, the late Sir Thomas Dixon. The first roses were planted in 1964 and the Trial roses were judged for the first time in summer 1965. A permanent panel of judges is provided by the Rose Society of Northern Ireland, formed by Craig Wallace in 1964.

Gallery

References

Further reading
Scott, Robert 2004. Wild Belfast on safari in the city. The Blackstaff Press Belfast.

External links
Virtual Visit – Sir Thomas and Lady Dixon Park
Walk NI guide to Sir Thomas and Lady Dixon Park

Gardens in Belfast
Parks in Belfast
Japanese gardens
Register of Parks, Gardens and Demesnes of Special Historic Interest